Janet H. Brown is an American political executive and former government official serving as the executive director of the Commission on Presidential Debates in the United States.

She has led the commission since its founding in 1987 and has worked in staff positions at the White House, Office of Management and Budget, United States Department of State, and United States Senate. She graduated with a Bachelor of Arts degree from Williams College and with a Master's Degree in Public Administration from Harvard University.

References

External links

Year of birth missing (living people)
Living people
United States Office of Management and Budget officials
American women in politics
Harvard Kennedy School alumni
Williams College alumni
21st-century American women